Debbie Fleming Caffery (born 1948) is an American photographer, known internationally for her documentary work of Louisiana.

Her work is held by the George Eastman Museum, the Museum of Contemporary Photography, the Museum of Modern Art, the New York Public Library, the Smithsonian American Art Museum, the Harvard Art Museums, and many other museums.

References

External links 
 Debbie Fleming Caffery — official site

Photographers from Louisiana
20th-century American photographers
21st-century American photographers
1948 births
Living people
20th-century American women photographers
21st-century American women photographers